Maria Johanna Theodora Martens  (born 8 January 1955 in Doetinchem, Gelderland) is a Dutch politician. She is a member of the Christian Democratic Appeal. From 2011 until 2019 she was a member of the Dutch Senate.

From 1999 to 2009 she was a Member of the European Parliament (MEP). There she was a member of the bureau of the EPP-ED group in the European Parliament and sat on the European Parliament's Committee on Development.

She was also a substitute for the Subcommittee on Security and Defence and a member of the delegation to the ACP-EU Joint Parliamentary Assembly.

Career
 Higher degree in theology (1984)
 NIMA (Netherlands Marketing Institute) A and B diplomas
 Lecturer in Life Philosophy (1984)
 Foreign Affairs Secretary, Netherlands Mission Council (1984–1988)
 Study secretary, VKMO (Association of Catholic Social Organisations) (1988–1999)
 Chairwoman, Nijmegen CDA
 Member of the party council
 Member of the editorial team of CD Verkenningen
 Chairwoman, European Forum of National Committees of the Laity (1996–2000)
 Chairwoman, Netherlands Episcopal Committee for the year 2000 (1996–2000)
 Member of the governing board of the Catholic Theological University, Utrecht (since 1998)
 Commissioner for recreation in the Veluwe area (RGV)
 Member of the executive board of the World Population Fund (WPF)
 Member of the European Parliament (since 1999)

References 
  Parlement.com biography

External links
 Official website
 European Parliament biography
 
 

1955 births
Living people
People from Doetinchem
Christian Democratic Appeal MEPs
Christian Democratic Appeal politicians
Dutch Roman Catholics
Dutch women in politics
Members of the Senate (Netherlands)
MEPs for the Netherlands 1999–2004
MEPs for the Netherlands 2004–2009
20th-century women MEPs for the Netherlands
21st-century women MEPs for the Netherlands
20th-century Dutch politicians
21st-century Dutch politicians